Brian Beers (born 31 January 1939) is a former Australian rules footballer who played for Collingwood and Fitzroy in the VFL.

Family
He is the father of Mark Beers and Tony Beers, who both also played for Collingwood.

Football

Collingwood (VFL)
A half forward, Beers was a member of Collingwood's 1958 premiership team and kicked two goals in the grand final. In 1959 he kicked a career high 28 goals for the year and the following season he played in the Collingwood side which lost the 1960 Grand Final.

Fitzroy (VFL)
He crossed to Fitzroy in 1962 where he finished his career.

On 6 July 1963, playing on the half-forward flank, he was a member of the young and inexperienced Fitzroy team that comprehensively and unexpectedly defeated Geelong, 9.13 (67) to 3.13 (31) in the 1963 Miracle Match.

Tennis
Beers also played tennis at a competitive level and later became the general manager of Tennis Victoria.

See also
 1963 Miracle Match

Notes

External links

1939 births
Australian rules footballers from Victoria (Australia)
Collingwood Football Club players
Collingwood Football Club Premiership players
Fitzroy Football Club players
Living people
One-time VFL/AFL Premiership players